The 1954 France rugby union tour of Argentina and Chile was a series of matches of the France national team during their tour to Argentina and Chile in 1954. It was the second visit of a French side to Argentina after the 1949 tour over the country.

French touring party arrived in Buenos Aires and then moved to Hindú Club, where the team would reside during their stay in Argentina. All the games in Argentina were played at Gimnasia y Esgrima de Buenos Aires, the main venue for rugby games in those years.

Touring party

 René Crabos (manager)
 Marcel Laurent (vice-manager)
 Paul Labadie
 Jean Bichindaritz
 Renè Bienes (capt.)
 Philibert Capitani
 Bernard Chevallier
 Yves Duffaut
 Michel Celaya
 Jean Barthe
 Pierre Danos
 Abdrè Haget
 Andrè Morel
 Gerard Murillo
 Roger Martine
 Lucien Roge
 Michel Vannier
 Andrè Boniface
 Jacques Meynard
 Robert Bassauri
 Jacques Barbe
 Andre Berilhe
 Henrie Lazies
 Jean Benetiere

Match summary 
Complete list of matches played by France in Argentina and Chile:

 Test matches

Notes

Match details
Legend
ADF= Deportiva Francesa, BCR=Buenos Aires C.R.C., BAC=Belgrano A.C., CASI=C.A. San Isidro, CP=Pucará, EB=La Plata, H= Hindú, LM=Los Matreros, LT=Los Tilos, OG= (Old Georgian), ORC= Olivos, OS= Obras Sanitarias, SIC=San Isidro Club

Belgrano A.C.: O.Elía; L.Camardón, R.Bazán, E.Gahan, C.Lennon; M.Hughes, P.Felisari; R.Pineo, E.Arntsen (capt.), E.Moore; A.Dillon, A.Parola; E.Hirsch; M.Caldwell J.Lescano.
France: M.Vannier; G.Murillo, R.Martine, A.Boniface, L.Rogé; A.Haget, P.Danos, Y.Duffaut, M.Celaya, J.Barthe; B.Chevallier, P.Capitani; R.Bienés (capt.), P.Labadie, J.Bichindaritz. 

 Combinado A: E.Niño (CASI); A.Caride (CASI), J.Guidi (ADF), E.Dramis (OS), C.Lennon (BAC); I.Comas (H), E.Holmgren (ORC); D.Cowan (BCR – capt.), A.Bublath (O.S.),R.Collie (OG); O.Martínez ((ADF), C.Brondsted (ORC); R.Gorostiaga (LT), V.Christianson ((ADF), R.Ferrari (LM).
France: M.Vannier; L.Rogé, R.Martine, R.Bassauri, A.Boniface; A.Haget, P.Danos; Y.Duffaut, M.Celaya, J.Barthe; B.Chevallier, P.Capitani; R.Bienés (capt.), J.Bénétiére, J.Bichindaritz. 

 Provincia: R.Frigerio (CP); L.Caffarone (ORC RC), A.Palma (CP), A.Salinas (ORC), O.Bernacchi (CP); J.Guidi ADF G.Ehrman (capt. – CP); J.Lourés (CP), M.Sarandón (SIC), R.Grosse (ORC); E.Domínguez (CP), O.Martínez ADF; C.Travaglini (CASI), H.Lambruschini (ORC), R.Follet (OG).
France: M.Vannier; G.Murillo, R.Martine, R.Bassauri, A.Boniface; A.Haget, P.Danos, Y.Duffaut, M.Celaya, J.Barthe; P.Capitani, B.'Chevallier; R.Bienés (capt.), J.Bénétiére, J.Bichindaritz. 

 C.A.S.I.: E.Niño; A.Caride, J.Berro García, P.Guastavino, C.Ramallo; J.M.Belgrano (capt.), F.Varela; L.Bavio, R.Aldao; R.Ochoa, W.Aniz, E.Pasman; C.Travaglini, M.Iraola, R.Lagarde.
France: R.Bassauri; L.Rogé, J.Murillo, J.Meynard, A.Boniface; A.Haget, J.Barbe, R.Bienés (capt.), M.Celaya, J.Barthe; B.Chevallier, P.Capitani; A.Berilhes, J.Bénétiére, H.Lazies. 

Capital: J.Comotto (H); J.Santiago (H), M.Hardy (AC), R.Bazan (BAC), C.Lennon (BAC), M.Hughes (BAC), P.Felisari (BAC); M.Aspiroz (OS), E.Arntsen (BAC), R.Pineo (BAC); B.Yustini (H), J.Repossi (OS); B.Grigolón (H), M.Caldwell (BAC), E.Hirsch (BAC).
France: M.Vannier; L.Rogé, R.Martine, A.Boniface, G, Muillo; R.Bassauri, P.Danos; J.Barthe, M.Celaya, Y.Duffaut; P.Capitani, B.Chevallier; R.Bienés, P.Labadie, J.Bichindaritz. 

 Eva Perón: C.Zaparat EB); J.Balbín (LT), C Mercader EB), A.Fernández EB), E.Vergara (LT); J.Ocampo (LT), J.Jáuregui EB); 1.Lembo EB), L.Nápoli EB), M.Morón (LT); C.Olivera EB), E.Gitard (LT); R.Gorostiaga (capt. – LT), A.Dentone EB), R.Giner EB).
France: M.Vannier; L.Rogó; R.Martine, R.Bassauri, A.Boniface; A.Haget, P.Danos; J.Barthe, M.Celaya (capt.), Y.Duffaut; P.Capitani, B.Chevallier; A.Barilhe, P.Labadie, J.Bichindaritz.

First test 

 Provincia: E.Niño (CASI); E.Caffarone (ORC), A.Salinas (ORC), A.Palma (CP), A.Caride (CASI); J.Guidi ADF, G.Ehman (capt.-CP); M.Sarandón (SIC), R.Grosse (ORC), L.Bavio (CASI); C.Brondstedt (ORC), O Martínez ADF; R.Follet (OG), V.Christianson ADF, C.Travaglini (CASI).
France: M.Vannier; A.Boniface, G.Murillo, J.Meynard, L.Rogé; R.Bassauri, P.Danos; J.Barthe, H.Lazies, Y.Duffaut; P.Capitani, B.Chevallier; R.Bienés (capt.), J.Bénétiére, J.Bichidaritz. 

 Pucará: R.Frigerio; H.Poulet, L.Trotta, A.Palma, O.Bernacchi; H.Laborde, G.Ehrman, E.Bonfante, C.Olavarría, J.Lourés; R.Cernadas; E.Domínguez; J.Culotta, E.Dacharry; F.Ibáñez.
France: M.Vannier; A.Boniface, R.Bassauri, G.Murillo, L.Rogé; R.Martine, P.Danos; J.Barthe, M.Celaya, Y.Duffaut; P.Capitani, A.Berilhe; R.Bienés, J.Bénétiére, J.Bichindaritz. 

Capital: O.Elía (BAC); J.Santiago (capt.-H), R.Bazán (BAC), E.Gahan (BAC), C.Lennon (BAC); M.Hughes (BAC), P.Felisari (BAC); E.Moore (BAC), E.Arntsen (BAC) M.Aspiroz (OS); J.Repossi (OS), B.Yustini (H); B.Grigolón (H), M.Caldwell (BAC), E.Hirsch (BAC).
France: M.Vannier; L.Rogé, A.Boniface, R.Bassauri, A.Morel; R.Martine, J.Barbe; J.Barthe, M.Celaya, A.Berilhe; P.Capitani, H.Lazies; R.Bienés (capt.), J.Bénétiére, J.Bichndaritz

Second test 

Chile: n/i
France: M.Vannier; A.Morel, A.Boniface, R.Basauri, J.Meynard; J.Barbe, P.Danos; H.Lazies, M.Celaya, J.Barthe; B.Chevallier, P.Capitani; A.Berilhe, P.Labadie, R.Bienés (capt.)
|}

Notes

References

France tour
Rugby union tours of Argentina
Rugby union tours of Chile
France national rugby union team tours
Rugby
Tour